Moarefi may refer to:
Sherko Moarefi, Kurdish activist
Moarefi, Iran, a village in Kermanshah Province